Raúl Pareja León (born 12 November 1974) is a retired Spanish footballer who played as a midfielder.

Career statistics

Club

Notes

References

1974 births
Living people
Spanish footballers
Association football midfielders
Segunda División players
Segunda División B players
RCD Mallorca players
RCD Mallorca B players
Real Madrid CF players
Real Madrid Castilla footballers
CD Leganés players
Orihuela CF players
FC Cartagena footballers